The Bermudian dollar (symbol: $; code: BMD; also abbreviated BD$; informally called the Bermuda dollar) is the official currency of the British Overseas Territory of Bermuda.  It is subdivided into 100 cents. The Bermudian dollar is not normally traded outside Bermuda, and is pegged to the United States dollar at a one-to-one ratio.  Both currencies circulate in Bermuda on an equal basis.

History

For nearly four hundred years Spanish dollars, known as "pieces of eight" were in widespread use on the world's trading routes, including the Caribbean region. However, following the revolutionary wars in Latin America, the source of these silver trade coins dried up. The United Kingdom had adopted a very successful gold standard in 1821, and so the year 1825 was an opportune time to introduce the British sterling coinage into all the British colonies. An imperial Order in Council was passed in that year for the purposes of facilitating this aim by making sterling coinage legal tender in the colonies at the specified rate of 1 Spanish dollar to 4 shillings, 4 pence sterling. As the sterling silver coins were attached to a gold standard, this exchange rate did not realistically represent the value of the silver in the Spanish dollars as compared to the value of the gold in the British gold sovereign. Because of this, the order had the effect in many colonies of driving sterling coinage out of circulation, rather than encouraging its use.

Remedial legislation had to be introduced in 1838 so as to change over to the more realistic rating of $1 = 4s 2d. However, in Jamaica, British Honduras, Bermuda, and later in the Bahamas also, the official rating was set aside in favour of what was known as the 'Maccaroni' tradition in which a British shilling, referred to as a 'Maccaroni', was treated as one quarter of a dollar. The common link between these four territories was the Bank of Nova Scotia which brought in the 'Maccaroni' tradition, resulting in the successful introduction of both sterling coinage and sterling accounts.  It wasn't however until 1 January 1842 that the authorities in Bermuda formally decided to make sterling the official currency of the colony to circulate concurrently with Doubloons (64 shillings) at the rate of $1 = 4s 2d.  Contrary to expectations, and unlike in the Bahamas where US dollars circulated concurrently with sterling, the Bermudans did not allow themselves to be drawn into the U. S. currency area.  The Spanish dollars fell away in the 1850s but returned again in the 1870s following the international silver crisis of 1873. In 1874, the Bermuda merchants agreed unanimously to decline to accept the heavy imports of US currency except at a heavy discount, and it was then exported again.  And in 1876, legislation was passed to demonetise the silver dollars for fear of them returning.  In 1882, the local 'legal tender act' demonetised the gold doubloon, which had in effect been the real standard in Bermuda, and this left pounds, shillings, and pence as the sole legal tender.

The pound sterling remained the official currency of Bermuda until 1970, though the Government of Bermuda did issue its own pound banknotes. With US and Canadian coins regularly appearing in circulation in Bermuda and the possibility of the devaluation of the pound sterling, Bermuda was compelled to adopt its own decimal currency. On 6 February 1970, Bermuda introduced a new decimal currency in the form of a dollar. The nascent Bermudian dollars circulated in conjunction with the new British decimal coinage a year before it was introduced in the United Kingdom. By adopting decimalisation early, Bermuda was also able to place orders for the coinage from the Royal Mint before other Commonwealth countries seeking to decimalise could. The link between the Bermudian dollar and the pound sterling was not broken until 31 July 1972, which allowed Bermuda to align to a one-to-one exchange rate with the US dollar. The decision for Bermuda to peg its dollar to the US dollar added convenience for the multitude of American tourists and businesses upon whom Bermuda largely relied.

Since 1972, Bermudian law has required that local businesses charge prices in Bermudian dollars which, if paid in US dollars, must be accepted at a rate of 1:1.  Only banks are legally allowed to exchange Bermudian dollars into US dollars or other currencies, subject to a 1.25% Foreign Currency Purchase Tax (some banks also charge an exchange fee).

Coins

Prior to decimalisation and conversion to the dollar, the Government of Bermuda did not issue its own coins, other than the commemorative Bermudian crowns, since the 19th Century at the latest. In 1970, the Bermuda Monetary Authority introduced coinage with denominations of 1, 5, 10, 25, and 50 cents. From its inception, the 1-cent coin was struck out of bronze until 1988, when it was replaced with copper-plated steel. The composition of the 1-cent coin was changed to copper-plated zinc in 1991. All other denominations, at the time, were minted from cupronickel.  Nickel-brass 1-dollar and 5-dollar coins were issued in 1983; neither were very popular, with the 5-dollar coin eventually being withdrawn from circulation on 1 January 1990. New 1-dollar coins that were thinner and one-third lighter than the 1983 issue were produced in 1988. The 50-cent denomination was also phased out, with the coins being called in on 1 May 1990. All denominations of Bermuda coinage depict the monarch of the United Kingdom on the obverse, currently Queen Elizabeth II. From 1970 through 1985, the royal effigy by Arnold Machin was used, followed by an effigy by Raphael Maklouf from 1986 through 1998. The current obverse, introduced in 1999, is the royal effigy sculpted by Ian Rank-Broadley.

Bermuda has occasionally released commemorative coins to celebrate certain events, historical milestones, flora, and fauna.  These coins bear a face value, but are generally seen more as collector's items or stores of value. Notable among these are the so-called "Bermuda triangles", which are pressed on special lobed triangular planchets, are minted in gold and silver, and come in denominations divisible by three.

Banknotes

In the 20th century, its pound notes were issued in all denominations (and the only coins used were UK ones).  In 1970, the government introduced dollar notes in denominations of 1, 5, 10, 20 and 50 dollars. From 1974, the Bermuda Monetary Authority took over paper money production, introducing 100-dollar notes in 1982 and 2 dollars in 1988, when the 1 dollar was replaced by a coin. 1970 dollar notes are all printed with Bermuda Government across the top. Later notes substitute Bermuda Monetary Authority. All of the "legacy" banknotes were withdrawn from circulation on 1 January 2014, but still able to be exchanged for new banknotes for 10 years. Including the original 1970 series, all horizontal-style banknotes will be phased out in favour of the vertical, 2009 series.

Redesign 

In 2008, it was announced that banknotes would be redesigned in celebration of Bermuda's 400th anniversary, the first redesign since the launch of the dollar. The new designs were described as "distinctly Bermudian", with Queen Elizabeth II being relegated to a minor position, using a royal effigy by Machin. They feature themes and scenes of maritime Bermuda, and like their predecessors are coloured by value. The serial number prefix on the first million notes is that of a Bermuda onion; subsequent notes will bear a conventional prefix. The series was issued on 9 March 2009. The Bermuda Monetary Authority was awarded "Bank Note of the Year" by the International Banknote Society for the design of the new $2 banknote. The 2009-series $50 banknote was modified in August 2012 to depict the correct species of longtail native to Bermuda. Originally, it erroneously depicted the red-billed tropicbird and was changed to the indigenous white-tailed tropicbird.

See also 
 Economy of Bermuda

References

Sources

External links 

 Bermuda Monetary Authority
 Essential facts about the Bermuda dollar (geared toward overseas visitors)

Circulating currencies
Currencies introduced in 1970
Currencies of British Overseas Territories
Currencies of the Commonwealth of Nations
Dollar
Economy of Bermuda
Fixed exchange rate
Currencies of North America